Ampelocalamus is a genus of Asian bamboo in the grass family). It is found mostly in Southern China, with some species in the eastern Himalayas and northern Indochina.

Species

References

Bambusoideae genera
Bambusoideae